Sebastiania subsessilis is a species of flowering plant in the family Euphorbiaceae. It was originally described as Excoecaria subsessilis Müll.Arg. in 1866. It is native from southern Brazil to Paraguay.

References

Plants described in 1866
Flora of Paraguay
subsessilis
Taxa named by Ferdinand Albin Pax